The Lo Nuestro Award for Pop Male Artist of the Year  is an award presented annually by American network Univision. It was first awarded in 1989 and has been given annually since. The accolade was established to recognize the most talented performers of Latin music. The nominees and winners were originally selected by a voting poll conducted among program directors of Spanish-language radio stations in the United States and also based on chart performance on Billboard Latin music charts, with the results being tabulated and certified by the accounting firm Deloitte. At the present time, the winners are selected by the audience through an online survey. The trophy awarded is shaped in the form of a treble clef.

The award was first presented to Mexican singer José José. Spanish singer-songwriter Enrique Iglesias holds the record for the most awards, winning on six occasions. Mexican artist Luis Miguel won five times in the 90's. Puerto-Rican American singer-songwriter Luis Fonsi have won in four ceremonies. Puerto-Rican American performer Chayanne have received three awards. American artist Marc Anthony earned the accolade for Pop Male Artist and also Tropical Male Artist, likewise, Mexican singers Alejandro Fernández and Cristian Castro have received both the Pop and Regional Mexican Male Artist. Guatemalan singer-songwriter Ricardo Arjona, with eight nominations, holds the record for most nominations without a win.

Winners and nominees
Listed below are the winners of the award for each year, as well as the other nominees for the majority of the years awarded.

See also
 Grammy Award for Best Latin Pop Album
 Latin Grammy Award for Best Male Pop Vocal Album

References

Pop Male Artist
Pop music awards
Awards established in 1989